Guram Sagaradze (also transliterated as Sagharadze; 12 January 1929 – 17 January 2013) was a Georgian actor whose career spanned more than 60 years and was principally associated with the Rustaveli Theatre.

Biography
Sagaradze was born into the family of the theatre actor Giorgi Sagaradze in Tbilisi in 1929. In 1951, he graduated from the Tbilisi State Theatrical Institute and joined the Rustaveli Theatre troupe, with which he made much of his fame and popularity, including for his memorable performance as Prince Kazbeki in Robert Sturua's production of The Caucasian Chalk Circle by Bertolt Brecht. He also made over a dozen appearances in the Georgian cinema. He was honored as the People's Artist of Georgia (1973) and decorated with the Shota Rustaveli State Prize (1976), the USSR State Prize (1979), the Order of Honour of Georgia (1998), and the State Prize of Georgia (1999).

Sagaradze died, at age 84, in Tbilisi in 2013. He was buried at the Didube Pantheon.

References

External links

1929 births
2013 deaths
Burials at Didube Pantheon
Male film actors from Georgia (country)
Actors from Tbilisi
Recipients of the Order of Honor (Georgia)
People's Artists of Georgia
20th-century male actors from Georgia (country)
Male stage actors from Georgia (country)
Rustaveli Prize winners